Fleming College Florence was a two-year coeducational program that granted an Associate of Arts degree. Founded in Lugano, Switzerland, in 1968, the college relocated in 1972 to Torre Di Gattaia, just off Viale Michelangelo on a hill above to Florence, Italy. Mrs. Mary Crist Fleming (1910-2009) was the school's founder. From 1956 until her death on January 27, 2009, she involved with the international education of young Americans in Europe.

History
In the fall of 1956, Fleming founded the American School in Switzerland as an experiment in international education designed to give American students strong preparation for American universities, with the additional dimension of exposure to cultures and training in languages other than their own. Fleming founded Le Chateau des Enfants, an educational summer program for children of many nations that continues to this day, and the American Repertory Theater in Europe, a summer theatre company that performed for many years with young American actors in southern and western Europe.

Fleming College Florence incorporated the Institute for European Culture, a one-year, pre-university program previously located in Lugano, Switzerland. The College was a division of the American School In Switzerland.

The Institute for European Culture (also known as the T.A.S.I.S. Post Graduate Program), was founded in Lugano in 1961, and attracted a significant portion of Fleming College students. T.A.S.I.S. continues today with campuses in Lugano, Surrey, England, Dorado, Puerto Rico and Sintra, Portugal. After briefly relocating to another site in Florence, Fleming College closed its doors at the end of the  1977 school year. 

In 1983, Mrs. Fleming was honored by the U.S. Secretary of Education for her "significant efforts and tremendous contributions towards the furtherance of education at the international level". He especially recognized the TASIS Schools which had "introduced thousands of Americans to European cultures and civilizations" and many foreign students to "the best that America has to offer in its education, culture, and opportunities."

References

Educational institutions established in 1968
Defunct universities and colleges in Italy
Education in Florence
Defunct universities and colleges in Switzerland
Educational institutions disestablished in 1977
Universities and colleges in Florence